Crešnevo is a village in the municipality of Makedonski Brod, North Macedonia.

Demographics
According to the 2002 census, the village had a total of 169 inhabitants. Ethnic groups in the village include:

Macedonians 168
Serbs 1

References

Villages in Makedonski Brod Municipality